Brothers is a 2017 Dutch adventure film directed by Bram Schouw. It was shortlisted by the EYE Film Institute Netherlands as one of the eight films to be selected as the potential Dutch submission for the Academy Award for Best Foreign Language Film at the 90th Academy Awards. However, it was not selected, with Layla M. being chosen as the Dutch entry.

Cast
 Jonas Smulders as Lukas
 Niels Gomperts as Alexander
 Christa Theret as Josephine

References

External links
 

2017 films
2017 drama films
2010s adventure drama films
2010s Dutch-language films
Dutch adventure drama films